Gallotia galloti (Gallot's lizard, Tenerife lizard, or Western Canaries lizard) is a species of wall lizard in genus Gallotia. It is endemic to the Canary Islands of Tenerife and La Palma.

Both the generic name, Gallotia, and the specific name, galloti, are in honor of D. Gallot, an amateur naturalist, who collected the type specimen.

Four subspecies are recognized:
Gallotia galloti eisentrauti - Northern Tenerife lizard (northern Tenerife)
Gallotia galloti galloti - Southern Tenerife lizard (central and southern Tenerife, including Teide)
Gallotia galloti insulanagae - Anaga lizard (Roque de Fuera de Anaga, offshore the Macizo de Anaga mountains, northeastern Tenerife)
Gallotia galloti palmae - La Palma lizard (La Palma)

The differences in colour pattern in adult males seems to have been the basis for the recognition of the northern and southern subspecies. The northern form is found at lower altitudes on the north-facing slopes, while the southern form is found above the pine forest on the north-facing slopes and the southern slopes of Tenerife. A recent genomic study has identified nuclear DNA differences between these regions, although they only seem to be found in small number of loci.

Its closest relative is the smaller Boettger's lizard, which occurs on El Hierro and La Gomera (Maca-Meyer et al. 2003). G. galloti is a sizeable lizard, though with strong males reaching up to 15.7 inches (including tail) it still belongs to the smaller Gallotia as the giant species can reach up to double that length.

Unlike most larger species of its genus, the Western Canaries lizard is a common animal. As it likes to eat ripe fruit, it can even be considered a nuisance in vineyards and orchards and is thus occasionally trapped or poisoned. Local populations thus may decline, but no subspecies currently are endangered. Due to its small area of occurrence, G. g. insulanagae is considered a vulnerable taxon, but it seems safe at present as its habitat is fairly inaccessible and included in the Parque Rural de Anaga (Blanco & González 1992).

The striking color of adult males and their curious nature endear them to many people. At popular sights such as Teide National Park, the lizards have become somewhat habituated to people.

References

Further reading
Brown RP, Paterson S, Risse J (2016). "Genomic signatures of historical allopatry and ecological divergence in an island lizard". Genome Biology and Evolution 8 (11): 3618–3626.
Cox SC, Carranza S, Brown RP (2010). "Divergence times and colonization of the Canary Islands by Gallotia lizards". Molecular Phylogenetics and Evolution 56 (2): 747–757.
Thorpe RS, Brown RP (1989). "Microgeographic variation in the colour pattern of the lizard Gallotia galloti within the island of Tenerife: distribution, pattern and hypothesis testing". Biological Journal of the Linnean Society 38 (4): 303–322.

External links
Blanco, Juan Carlos; González, José Luis (editors) (1992). Libro rojo de los vertebrados de España. ICONA, Madrid. (in Spanish).
Maca-Meyer N, Carranza S, Rando JC, Arnold EN, Cabrera VM (2003). "Status and relationships of the extinct giant Canary Island lizard Gallotia goliath (Reptilia: Lacertidae), assessed using ancient mtDNA from its mummified remains". Biol. J. Linn. Soc. 80 (4): 659–670.  (HTML abstract)
Herp.it: Gallotia galloti. Many photos, especially of G. g. eisentrauti.
lacerta.de: Gallotia galloti eisentrauti image gallery. Retrieved 2007-FEB-25.
lacerta.de: Gallotia galloti galloti image gallery. Retrieved 2007-FEB-25.
lacerta.de: Gallotia galloti insulanagae image gallery.
lacerta.de: Gallotia galloti palmae image gallery. Retrieved 2007-FEB-25.

Gallotia
Reptiles described in 1839
Reptiles of the Canary Islands
Endemic fauna of the Canary Islands
Taxa named by Paul-Louis Oudart